Federico Ermacora (born 6 March 2000) is an Italian footballer who plays as a defender for  club Renate.

Club career
He is a product of Udinese youth system and started playing for their Under-19 squad in the 2016–17 season.

On 15 July 2019, he joined Serie C club Triestina on a season-long loan. He made his professional Serie C debut for Triestina on 24 November 2019 in a game against Südtirol. He started the game and played a complete match.

On 1 September 2020, he joined Carrarese on loan.

On 21 July 2021, he left Udinese and signed for Serie C club Renate.

International career
He was first called up to represent his country in 2015 for the Under-15 squad. He subsequently appeared for the national teams in the next 3 age brackets, all in friendlies.

References

External links
 

2000 births
Living people
Sportspeople from Udine
Italian footballers
Association football defenders
Serie C players
Udinese Calcio players
U.S. Triestina Calcio 1918 players
Carrarese Calcio players
A.C. Renate players
Italy youth international footballers
Footballers from Friuli Venezia Giulia